Ho Ka Seng (born 21 October 1993) is an association football forward from Macau who is currently a member of the Macau national football team and the club Chao Pak Kei. Ho made his debut for the Macau national team against Mauritius on 22 March 2018. He has been a member of Chao Pak Kei since 2015.

References 

1993 births
Living people
Macau footballers
Association football forwards
Macau international footballers